Ira Bowman (born June 11, 1973) is a retired American professional basketball player formerly in the National Basketball Association (NBA). He is currently an assistant men's basketball coach for Auburn University.

He attended Providence College and the University of Pennsylvania but was not selected in an NBA Draft. He played for the Philadelphia 76ers and the Atlanta Hawks from 1999 to 2001. He played for the Connecticut Pride of the Continental Basketball Association (CBA) from 1996 to 2001 and earned nominations to the CBA All-Defensive Team in 1999 and 2000. He played for the Grand Rapids Hoops of the CBA in 2002. He also played 13 games in the NBL for the Gold Coast Rollers in 1996.

Bowman played high school basketball at Seton Hall Preparatory School in West Orange, New Jersey, where he led the team to a 31–1 record as a senior and became the school's all-time career points leader.  He was also the Ivy League Player of the Year (1995–1996) when he was playing for the University of Pennsylvania.

Coaching career
Bowman, who was born in Newark, worked with Newark-based New Jersey Institute of Technology as an assistant basketball coach from 2008 to 2012 assisting head-coach Jim Engles in rebuilding the NCAA Division I record-setting (Division I transitional period) NJIT Highlanders men's basketball team.  Bowman was hired by the University of Pennsylvania in June 2012 as an assistant coach at his alma mater.  In 2018, Auburn basketball coach Bruce Pearl hired Bowman as an assistant coach.

References

External links

1973 births
Living people
African-American basketball players
American expatriate basketball people in Australia
American expatriate basketball people in Italy
Atlanta Hawks players
Auburn Tigers men's basketball coaches
Basket Napoli players
Basketball coaches from New Jersey
Basketball players from Newark, New Jersey
Connecticut Pride players
Gold Coast Rollers players
NJIT Highlanders men's basketball coaches
Penn Quakers men's basketball coaches
Penn Quakers men's basketball players
Philadelphia 76ers players
Providence Friars men's basketball players
Seton Hall Preparatory School alumni
Shooting guards
Small forwards
Undrafted National Basketball Association players
American men's basketball players
21st-century African-American sportspeople
20th-century African-American sportspeople